Outlast Technologies, commonly referred to as Outlast, develops and sells phase change materials (PCMs) in the United States and internationally. Outlast offers Thermocules, a microencapsulated phase change materials, which are incorporated into fabrics and fibers for absorbing, storing, and releasing excess heat. The company’s products comprise temperature regulating textiles, fabrics, fibers, and knits. Its products are used in outdoor sports, bedding, apparel, and footwear applications, as well as home furnishings, packaging, military, and medical markets.  Outlast Technologies was inducted into the Space Technology Hall of Fame in 2005 and became a Certified Space Technology in 2003. The company was formerly known as Gateway Technologies, Inc. and changed its name to Outlast Technologies, Inc. in 1997. Outlast Technologies, Inc. was founded in 1990 and is headquartered in Boulder, Colorado, US with operations in Heidenheim, Germany; and Tokyo, Japan.

Application Methods 
There are three main application methods of phase change material incorporation: matrix infusion coating, in-fiber, and coating.

Matrix Infusion Coating 

PCM Thermocules are finely printed onto flat fabric for next to skin products.  Matrix infusion coating allows for an unchanged hand, drape, and wick.

In-Fiber 

Acrylic, viscose, or polyester fibers are melt-spun with Thermocule PCM to achieve fiber embedded with PCM.  This fiber is then spun into yarns then into fabrics or finished products.  In-fiber is used for next to skin products.

Coating 

Coated materials offer the highest loading capacity of PCM and thus the largest heat storage capacity of any application technique.  Coated materials are not intended for next to skin products.

End-Uses 
The majority of Outlast end-products fall in the categories of bedding, apparel, and footwear.  The following table gives a non-exhaustive list of Outlast end-products.

References

Companies based in Boulder, Colorado
Manufacturing companies of the United States